"Out in the Middle" is a song by American country music group Zac Brown Band. It was released on January 24, 2022 as the second single from their seventh atudio album The Comeback. Lead singer Zac Brown wrote the song with Ben Simonetti, Jonathan Singleton, and Luke Combs. The band, including new full-time member Caroline Jones, performed the song live at the 56th Annual Country Music Association Awards with Marcus King and Jimmie Allen.

Content
Carena Liptak of Taste of Country described the song as similar to the band's earlier works and a "made for the stage roots anthem". Zac Brown, lead singer of Zac Brown Band, wrote the song with Ben Simonetti, Jonathan Singleton, and Luke Combs. Brown told Taste of Country that the song had "Southern rock storytelling" and was ""It's a tip of the hat to the people who live out in the middle of nowhere and they're happy being there".

In June 2022, the band re-released The Comeback with a bonus remix of the song featuring guest vocals from Blake Shelton.

The song also received a music video, released in March 2022. Ryan McLemore directed the video and filmed it in Leesville, South Carolina.

Chart performance

Weekly charts

Year-end charts

References

2022 songs
2022 singles
Zac Brown Band songs
Blake Shelton songs
Warner Records singles
Songs written by Zac Brown
Songs written by Luke Combs
Songs written by Jonathan Singleton
Vocal collaborations